Sherwin Summit (el. 6,427 feet, 1,959 m) is a mountain pass on U.S. Highway 395.

It is located east of Tom's Place and Crowley Lake in the eastern part of the Sierra Nevada range. The Owens River generally follows the road from this summit through the Owens Valley. Motorists who come from the south usually cross this summit in order to go to the high-altitude towns like Mammoth Lakes to the northwest to escape the smothering summer heat in the deserts. The pass receives snowfall during the winter, although the region receives relatively little precipitation annually.

The 1946 film My Pal Trigger was filmed here.

References

Landforms of Mono County, California
Mountain passes of California